Joseph Thomas Enright was an Irish professional footballer who played as a forward in the Football League for Leeds City. He also played in the Southern League for Newport County and Coventry City and won an international cap for Ireland.

Personal life 
Enwright was born at home on Glasses Lane (now Griffith Street) in Athlone to Thomas Enright, a labourer, and Elizabeth Enright (née Garty). Enwright served in the Royal Army Ordnance Corps during the First World War. As of March 2014, his great nephew Chris Enright was on the staff at Athlone Town.

Career statistics

References

1890 births
Republic of Ireland association footballers
Pre-1950 IFA international footballers
Shelbourne F.C. players
Association football inside forwards
Association football outside forwards
Royal Army Ordnance Corps soldiers
British Army personnel of World War I
Year of death missing
Leeds City F.C. players
Newport County A.F.C. players
Coventry City F.C. players
Athlone Town A.F.C. players
English Football League players
Southern Football League players
NIFL Premiership players
Irish League representative players
People from Athlone
Place of death missing
Military personnel from County Roscommon
Military personnel from County Westmeath